The 2018 European Weightlifting Championships was held at the Complexul Olimpic Izvorani in Bucharest, Romania from 26 March to 1 April 2018.

Some countries were banned from competing at the championships due to their history of doping at previous Olympic Games. International Weightlifting Federation rules state that any country that had three positive tests uncovered by the International Olympic Committee during re-testing of stored urine samples for banned substances from the 2008 Olympic Games and 2012 Olympic Games would be banned. The banned countries are: Russia, Armenia, Turkey, Moldova, Ukraine, Belarus and Azerbaijan.

Medal overview

Men

Women

Men's results

Men's 56 kg

Men's 62 kg

Men's 69 kg

Men's 77 kg

Men's 85 kg

Men's 94 kg

Men's 105 kg

Men's +105 kg

Women's results

Women's 48 kg

Women's 53 kg

Women's 58 kg

Women's 63 kg

Women's 69 kg

Women's 75 kg

Women's 90 kg

Women's +90 kg

Medals tables

Results including snatch and clean & jerk medals

Total results

Participating nations
A total of 208 competitors from 30 nations participated.

References

External links
IWF Results
Results book 

European Weightlifting Championships
2018 in weightlifting
2018 in Romanian sport
Sports competitions in Bucharest
International weightlifting competitions hosted by Romania
European Weightlifting Championships
European Weightlifting Championships